Nawa Station (名和駅) is the name of two train stations in Japan:

 Nawa Station (Aichi)
 Nawa Station (Tottori)